COTC may stand for:

 Canadian Officers' Training Corps, Canada's university officer training programme
 Car of the Century, an international award given to the most influential car of the Twentieth Century
 Central Ohio Technical College, public two-year technical college based in Newark, Ohio, United States
 Children of the Corn (disambiguation)
 "Children of the Corn", a 1977 short story by Stephen King
 Children of the Corn (film series), film series began with Children of the Corn, released in 1984
 Children of the Corn (1984 film), the 1984 film derived from the aforementioned story
 Children of the Corn (2009 film), 2009 made-for-television remake of the 1984 film
 Children of the Corn (album), an album by Sopor Æternus & the Ensemble of Shadows
 Children of the Corn (group), 1990's hip-hop group
 "Children of the Korn", a song by Korn
 Church of the Creator, a Christian-based faith organization in Ashland, Oregon, United States
 Clash of the Champions, a semi-annual professional wrestling event held by the National Wrestling Alliance and later World Championship Wrestling
 Craig of the Creek, a Cartoon Network TV series
 Creativity Movement, a white supremacist church organisation based in Illinois, United States, formerly known as World Church of the Creator
 Corn on the cob, a culinary term for a cooked ear of corn
Core of the Core, an oil and gas term for the geologic sweet spot in the center of the center of a desired area of interest.